Somula is a genus of syrphid flies in the family Syrphidae. There are at least two described species in Somula.

Species
Somula decora Macquart, 1847
Somula mississippiensis Hull, 1922

References

Further reading

External links

 

Eristalinae
Hoverfly genera
Diptera of North America
Taxa named by Pierre-Justin-Marie Macquart